This is a list of churches in the United Reformed Church, a medium-sized Protestant denomination in the United Kingdom. In 1972, the Presbyterian Church of England united with the Congregational Church in England and Wales to form the United Reformed Church (URC).

The 2022 General Assembly report wrote, "As a denomination, we are a small fraction of who and what we were in 1972 – we have about a fifth of the membership we had on our formation, and the number of churches has fallen from a little over 2,000 to a little under 1,300. We have about three-fifths the number of churches compared with one-fifth of the membership. These churches are served by 390 Ministers (Stipendiary and Non-Stipendiary), compared to 1,844 in 1972. Again, the ‘workforce’ of Ministers of Word and Sacrament is about one-fifth of the number 50 years ago."

Synods 

1Challenge to Change, the report of a Welsh Churches Survey conducted by the Bible Society in 1995, showed that there were 140 United Reformed chapels.

East Midlands Synod

Former URC churches in East Midlands Synod

Eastern Synod

Former URC churches in Eastern Synod

Mersey Synod

Former URC churches in Mersey Synod

Northern Synod

Former URC churches in Northern Synod

North Western Synod

Former URC churches in North Western Synod

Scotland Synod

Former URC churches in Scotland Synod

South Western Synod 
Website

Former URC churches in South Western Synod

Southern Synod 
Website

Former URC churches in Southern Synod

Thames North Synod

Former URC churches in Thames North Synod

Wales Synod 

1Baptist (GB), Baptist (Wales), CiW, Congregational, Methodist, Presbyterian, Independents, URC

Former URC churches in Wales Synod

Wessex Synod

Former URC churches in Wessex Synod

West Midlands Synod

Former URC churches in West Midlands Synod

Yorkshire Synod

Former URC churches in Yorkshire Synod

References

Bibliography

External links
In recent years the URC has surpassed any other denomination by producing detailed year-by-year reports of which of its churches have closed, complete in the majority of cases with short histories. Reports on recently closed URC churches may be found at the following:

Churches that closed in 2002-03
Churches that closed in 2003-04
Churches that closed in 2004-05
Churches that closed in 2005-06 (also contains on p7 a map of the geographical coverage of Synods)
Churches that closed in 2006-07
Churches that closed in 2007-08
Churches that closed in 2008-10
Churches that closed in 2010-12
Churches that closed in 2012-14
Churches that closed in 2014-16
Churches that closed in 2016-18
Churches that closed in 2018-20
Churches that closed in 2020-21
Churches that closed in 2021-22

United Reformed Church
United Reformed Church